This article is a list of diseases of the Jerusalem cherry (Solanum pseudocapsicum).

Fungal diseases

Nematodes, parasitic

Viral and viroid diseases

References

External links
Common Names of Diseases, The American Phytopathological Society

Jerusalem cherry
Solanum